Irving & Casson was a Boston, Massachusetts, firm of interior designers and furniture makers, founded in 1875. 

Its specialty was interior woodwork and mantels, but it also made furniture, primarily in the styles of the 17th, 18th and early 19th centuries. In 1914 or 1916, the firm merged with A. H. Davenport Company, a furniture company also located in Boston (both had factories in East Cambridge). After the merger, the company executed a number of commissions for Gothic Revival churches, including the chapels at Duke University and the University of Pittsburgh. The company’s last major design commission was for the interiors for the United Nations Headquarters in New York City, executed in the 1950s. Irving & Casson–A. H. Davenport Co. went out of business in 1974.

References

Design companies disestablished in 1974
Design companies established in 1875
Furniture companies of the United States
Interior design firms
Manufacturing companies based in Boston
1875 establishments in Massachusetts
1974 disestablishments in Massachusetts
Defunct manufacturing companies based in Massachusetts